The United States Army Reserve (USAR) is a reserve force of the United States Army. Together, the Army Reserve and the Army National Guard constitute the Army element of the reserve components of the United States Armed Forces.

Since July 2020, the Chief of the United States Army Reserve is Lieutenant General Jody J. Daniels. The senior enlisted leader of the Army Reserve is Command Sergeant Major Andrew J. Lombardo.

History

Origins

On 23 April 1908 Congress created the Medical Reserve Corps, the official predecessor of the Army Reserve. After World War I, under the National Defense Act of 1920, Congress reorganized the U.S. land forces by authorizing a Regular Army, a National Guard and an Organized Reserve (Officers Reserve Corps and Enlisted Reserve Corps) of unrestricted size, which later became the Army Reserve. This organization provided a peacetime pool of trained Reserve officers and enlisted men for use in war. The Organized Reserve included the Officers Reserve Corps, Enlisted Reserve Corps and Reserve Officers' Training Corps (ROTC).

Interwar period and World War II

The Organized Reserve infantry divisions raised immediately after World War I generally continued the lineage and geographic area distribution of National Army divisions that had served in the war. They were maintained on paper with all of their officers and one-third of their enlisted men. Units in other arms of the Army besides infantry, most notably cavalry, field artillery and engineers were also formed. Organized Reserve units sometimes maintained relationships with one or several colleges or universities in close proximity, which populated them with officers through the ROTC.

Service in the Organized Reserve during the interwar period was not as appealing as the Army expected, and suffered because of limited funding that restricted training opportunities. Most divisions reached their full complement of officers, but had less than 100 enlisted men, since there was no incentive for them to serve. The extent of prewar mobilization--"a state neither of war nor of peace"--disrupted the Organized Reserve, and officers were called to active duty individually beginning in 1940 and assigned to Regular Army and National Guard units. When the Organized Reserve was nominally mobilized via presidential order beginning in 1942, "few of the Reserve officers originally assigned to...units were available for duty with them. Consequently, the units as activated bore small resemblance to those of peacetime." The order and timetable in which the Organized Reserve divisions were ordered to active duty was based upon a number of factors, such as the number of World War I battle honors earned, if applicable, the location and availability of training sites, and the ability of the Army to furnish divisional cadres and filler replacements.

The 101st Infantry Division was designated a division of the Organized Reserve after World War I and assigned to the state of Wisconsin; unlike the 82nd Airborne Division, the Reserve division was disbanded when the 101st Airborne Division was raised in the Army of the United States on 15 August 1942.

Cold War

A tentative troop basis for the Organized Reserve Corps (ORC), prepared in March 1946, outlined 25 divisions: three armored, five airborne, and 17 infantry. These divisions and all other Organized Reserve Corps units were to be maintained in one of three strength categories, labeled Class A, Class B, and Class C. Class A units were divided into two groups, one for combat and one for service, and units were to be at required table of organization strength; Class B units were to have their full complement of officers and enlisted cadre strength; and Class C were to have officers only. The troop basis listed nine divisions as Class A, nine as Class B, and seven as Class C.

Major General Ray E. Porter therefore proposed reclassification of all Class A divisions as Class B units. Eventually the War Department agreed and made the appropriate changes. Although the dispute over Class A units lasted several months, the War Department proceeded with the reorganization of the Organized Reserve Corps divisions during the summer of 1946. That all divisions were to begin as Class C (officers only) units, progressing to the other categories as men and equipment became available, undoubtedly influenced the decision. Also, the War Department wanted to take advantage of the pool of trained reserve officers and enlisted men from World War II. By that time Army Ground Forces had been reorganized as an army group headquarters that commanded six geographic armies. The armies replaced the nine corps areas of the prewar era, and the army commanders were tasked to organize and train both Regular Army and Organized Reserve Corps units.

The plan the army commanders received called for twenty-five Organized Reserve Corps divisions, but the divisions activated between September 1946 and November 1947 differed somewhat from the original plans. The First United States Army declined to support an airborne division, and the 98th Infantry Division replaced the 98th Airborne Division. After the change, the Organized Reserve Corps had four airborne, three armored, and eighteen infantry divisions. The Second Army insisted upon the number 80 for its airborne unit because the division was to be raised in the prewar 80th Division's area, not that of the 99th. Finally, the 103rd Infantry Division, organized in 1921 in New Mexico, Colorado, and Arizona, was moved to Iowa, Minnesota, South Dakota, and North Dakota in the Fifth United States Army area. The Seventh Army (later replaced by Third Army), allotted the 15th Airborne Division, refused the designation, and the adjutant general replaced it by constituting the 108th Airborne Division, which fell within that component's list of infantry and airborne divisional numbers. Thus the final tally of divisions formed after World War II appears to have been the 19th, 21st, and 22d Armored Divisions; the 80th, 84th, 100th and 108th Airborne Divisions; and the 76th, 77th, 79th, 81st, 83rd, 85th, 87th, 89th, 90th, 91st, 94th, 95th, 96th, 97th, 98th, 102nd, 103rd, and 104th Infantry Divisions.  
 
A major problem in forming divisions and other units in the Organized Reserve Corps was adequate housing.  While many National Guard units owned their own armories, some dating back to the nineteenth century, the Organized Reserve Corps had no facilities for storing equipment and for training.  Although the War Department requested funds for needed facilities, Congress moved slowly in response.  The Organized Reserves were redesignated 25 March 1948 as the Organized Reserve Corps. Recognizing the importance of the Organized Reserve to the World War II effort, Congress authorized retirement and drill pay for the first time in 1948.

During the summer and fall of 1951 the six army commanders in the United States, staff agencies, and the Section V Committee (created after World War I for the reserve components to have a voice in their affairs), evaluated Department of the Army reorganization plans for the ORC. The army commanders urged that all divisions in the Organized Reserve Corps be infantry divisions because they believed that the reserves could not adequately support armored and airborne training. They thought thirteen, rather than twelve, reserve divisions should be maintained to provide a better geographic distribution of the units. The Section V Committee opposed the reduction of the Organized Reserve Corps from twenty-five to thirteen divisions because it feared unfavorable publicity, particularly with the nation at war. On 20 December the Vice Chief of Staff of the United States Army, General John E. Hull, directed the reorganization and redesignation of airborne and armored divisions as infantry as soon as practicable. In March 1952 the 80th, 84th, 100th, and 108th Airborne Divisions were reorganized and redesignated as infantry divisions, and the 63d, 70th, and 75th Infantry Divisions replaced the 13th, 21st, and 22d Armored Divisions.

Before the dust had settled on the reforms, the Army realized that it had failed to improve unit manning or meet reasonable mobilization requirements. In the fall of 1952 Army leaders thus proposed that the personnel from the thirteen inactivated Army Reserve divisions be assigned to strengthen the remaining twelve divisions. To keep the unneeded fifteen Army Reserve divisions active, they were to be reorganized as training divisions to staff training centers upon mobilization or man maneuver area commands for training troops. The continental army commanders implemented the new Army Reserve troop basis in 1955 piecemeal. They reorganized, without approved tables of organization, the 70th, 76th, 78th, 80th, 84th, 85th, 89th, 91st, 95th, 98th, 100th, and 108th Infantry Divisions as cadre for replacement training centers and organized the 75th "Maneuver Area Command" using the resources of the 75th Infantry Division. Two years later the 75th Infantry Division was inactivated along with 87th Infantry Division. Assets of the 87th were used to organize a maneuver area command; thus one unneeded division remained in the troop basis.

While the Korean War was still underway, Congress began making significant changes in the structure and role of the Army Reserve. These changes transformed the Organized Reserve into the United States Army Reserve, from 9 July 1952. This new organization was divided into a Ready Reserve, Standby Reserve, and Retired Reserve. Army Reserve units were authorized twenty-four inactive duty training days a year and up to seventeen days of active duty (called annual training).

In 1959 the Army decided to realign National Guard and Army Reserve divisions under Pentomic structures. Secretary of Defense Neil H. McElroy decided on 10 Army Reserve divisions. By October 1959 ten Army Reserve infantry divisions completed their transition, but at a reduced strength. The eleventh combat division in the Army Reserve, the 104th, was converted to training, for a total of thirteen training divisions, all of which were in the Army Reserve.

To reorganize the Army Reserve to the new ROAD structures in the early 1960s, the Army Staff decided to retain one Army Reserve division in each of the six Army areas and to eliminate four divisions. Army commanders selected the 63d, 77th, 81st, 83d, 90th, and 102d Infantry Divisions for retention and reorganized them under ROAD by the end of April 1963. Each division had two tank and six infantry battalions.

With the elimination of the 79th, 94th, 96th, and 103d Infantry Divisions, the Army decided to retain their headquarters as a way to preserve spaces for general and field grade officers. It reorganized the units as operational headquarters (subsequently called command headquarters [division]) and directed them to supervise the training of combat and support units located in the former divisional areas and to provide for their administrative support. Some former divisional units assigned to the four divisions were used to organize four brigades, which added flexibility to the force as well as provided four general officer reserve billets. In January and February 1963 the 157th, 187th, 191st, and 205th Infantry Brigades were organized with headquarters in Pennsylvania, Massachusetts, Montana, and Minnesota, respectively. The designation of each brigade was derived from the lowest numbered infantry brigade associated with the division under the square structure. As with the Regular Army brigades, the number and type of maneuver elements in each Army Reserve brigade varied.

In November 1965, a long-standing controversial goal of the Defense Department, a reduction of the reserve troop basis, was achieved. Those reserve units that were judged unnecessary and others that were undermanned and underequipped were deleted and their assets used to field contingency forces. Among the units inactivated were the last six combat divisions in the Army Reserve, the 63d, 77th, 81st, 83d, 90th, and 102d Infantry Divisions, and the 79th, 94th, and 96th Command Headquarters (Division). The 103d Command Headquarters (Division) was converted to a support brigade headquarters.

A number of U.S. Army Reserve corps headquarters were disestablished on 31 March 1968. They were reorganized as Army Reserve Commands.

In 1980, the peacetime USAR chain of command was overlaid with a wartime trace. In an expansion of the roundout and affiliation programs begun ten years earlier, CAPSTONE purported to align every Army Reserve unit with the active and reserve component units with which they were anticipated to deploy. Units maintained lines of communication with the units – often hundreds or thousands of miles away in peacetime – who would presumably serve above or below them in the event of mobilization. This communication, in some cases, extended to coordinated annual training opportunities.

Despite the commonly held belief that CAPSTONE traces were set in stone, the process of selecting units to mobilize and deploy in 1990 and 1991 in support of Operation Desert Shield and Desert Storm frequently ignored CAPSTONE.

Post Cold War 
In the post-Cold War draw-down, all of the Army Reserve's combat units were disbanded, except the 100th Battalion, 442nd Infantry Regiment. This meant the disestablishment of the three remaining Army Reserve fighting brigades: the 157th Infantry Brigade (Mechanized) (Separate) of Pennsylvania, the 187th Infantry Brigade (Separate) of Massachusetts, and the 205th Infantry Brigade (Separate) (Light) of Minnesota. Many of the Army Reserve training divisions were realigned as institutional training divisions.

With the Army National Guard providing reserve component combat formations and related combat support units, the Army Reserve is configured to provide combat support, combat service support, peacekeeping, nation-building and civil support capability. With roughly twenty percent of the Army's organized units and 5.3 percent of the Army's budget, the Army Reserve provides about half of the Army's combat support and a quarter of the Army's mobilization base expansion capability.

Global War on Terrorism

Reserve service today

Reserve Component (RC) Soldiers mainly perform part-time duties as opposed to the full-time (active duty) Soldiers, but rotate through mobilizations to full-time duty. When not on active duty, RC Soldiers typically perform training and service one weekend per month, currently referred to as Battle Assembly, and for two continuous weeks at a time during the year referred to as Annual Training (AT). Many RC Soldiers are organized into Army Reserve troop program units (TPU), while others serve in active Army units as Individual Mobilization Augmentees (IMA), or are in non-drilling control groups of the Individual Ready Reserve (IRR). Soldiers may also serve on active duty in an Active Guard/Reserve (AGR) status in support of the United States Army Reserve (USAR) mission or through Active Duty Operational Support (ADOS) and Contingency Operations-Active Duty Operational Support (CO-ADOS) missions.

All United States Army soldiers sign an initial eight-year service contract upon entry into the military. Occasionally, the contract specifies that some of the service will be in the Regular Army (also called Active Component/AC) for two, three, or four-year periods; with the remaining obligation served in the RC. Though typically, soldiers sign contracts specifying that all eight years be served in the RC, with the first six years in drilling status and the last two years in a non-drilling IRR status.

Soldiers entering directly into the U.S. Army Reserve nevertheless encompasses a period of initial entry training (IET). The amount of time begins with approximately nine weeks of Basic Combat Training (BCT), but total IET time varies according to the enlistee's elected Military Occupational Specialty (MOS) which dictates Advanced Individual Training (AIT). All U.S. Army Reserve Soldiers are subject to mobilization throughout the term of their enlistment. Soldiers who, after completing the AC portion of their enlistment contract choose not to re-enlist on active duty, are automatically transferred to the RC to complete the remainder of their Statutory Obligation (eight-year service total) and may be served in a drilling Troop Program Unit (TPU), Individual Mobilization Augmentee (IMA), or Individual Ready Reserve (IRR) status.

Non-commissioned officers of the rank of Staff Sergeant (E-6) and above will reenlist for an indefinite status after they have served for 12 years of service or more.

The United States Army Reserve was composed of 188,703 soldiers as of late 2020.

Importance to the Active Army

A significant portion of many unit types and specializations exist in the Army Reserve.  Some unique enabling units only exist in the Army Reserve.

Current active reserve formations and units

Headquarters commands
 Army Reserve Headquarters - Fort Bragg (formerly United States Army Reserve Command (USARC)) located at Fort Bragg, North Carolina
Through USARC, the CAR commands all Army Reserve units. USARC is responsible for the staffing, training, management, and deployment of units to ensure readiness for Army missions. The Army Reserve consists of three main categories of units: operational and functional, support, and training. Due to Base Realignment and Closure Act, the headquarters of USAR moved to Fort Bragg.

 Army Reserve Staff - National Capital Region (NCR) (formerly Office of the Chief of Army Reserve (OCAR)) located at both Fort Belvoir, Virginia and The Pentagon 
OCAR provides the Chief of Army Reserve (CAR) with a staff of functional advisors who develop and execute Army Reserve plans, policies and programs, plus administer Army Reserve personnel, operations, and funding. The CAR is responsible for plans, policies and programs affecting all Army Reserve Soldiers, including those who report directly to the Army. OCAR is composed of specialized groups that advise and support the CAR on a wide variety of issues.

Functional commands 
 3rd Medical Command (Deployment Support), in Forest Park, GA
 75th Innovation Command, in Houston, TX
 76th Operational Response Command, in Fort Douglas, UT
 79th Sustainment Support Command, in Los Alamitos, CA
 85th Support Command, in Arlington Heights, IL
 200th Military Police Command, at Fort Meade, MD
 311th Signal Command (Theater), at Fort Shafter, HI
 335th Signal Command (Theater), in East Point, GA
 377th Sustainment Command (Theater), in Belle Chasse, LA
 412th Theater Engineer Command, in Vicksburg, Mississippi
 416th Theater Engineer Command, in Darien, IL
 807th Medical Command (Deployment Support), at Fort Douglas, UT
 U.S. Army Reserve Support Command, First Army, at Rock Island, IL
 Army Reserve Aviation Command at Fort Knox, KY
 Army Reserve Careers Group at Fort Knox, KY
 Army Reserve Medical Command at Pinellas Park, Florida
 U.S. Army Reserve Legal Command, in Gaithersburg, MD
 Military Intelligence Readiness Command, at Fort Belvoir, VA
 Army Civil Affairs and Psychological Operations Command (Airborne), at Fort Bragg, NC

Geographic commands 
 1st Mission Support Command, at Fort Buchanan, Puerto Rico - providing support in Puerto Rico and United States Virgin Islands
 7th Mission Support Command, in Kaiserslautern, Germany
 9th Mission Support Command, at Fort Shafter, HI, under operational control of Army Pacific - providing support in Hawaii, Alaska, American Samoa, Japan, South Korea, Guam and Saipan.
 63rd Readiness Division, in Mountain View, CA - providing support in California, Nevada, New Mexico, Arizona, Texas, Oklahoma and Arkansas
 81st Readiness Division, at Fort Jackson, SC - providing support in Florida, Louisiana, Mississippi, Alabama, Georgia, North Carolina, South Carolina, Kentucky, Tennessee and Puerto Rico
 88th Readiness Division, at Fort McCoy, WI - providing support in Washington, Oregon, Idaho, Montana, Wyoming, North Dakota, South Dakota, Utah, Colorado, Nebraska, Kansas, Wisconsin, Michigan, Illinois, Indiana, Minnesota, Iowa, Missouri and Ohio
 99th Readiness Division, at Joint Base McGuire–Dix–Lakehurst, NJ - providing support in New Jersey, New York, New Hampshire, Pennsylvania, Massachusetts, Vermont, Rhode Island, West Virginia, Maryland, Delaware, Maine, Connecticut and Virginia

Training commands 
 80th Training Command (The Army School System), in Richmond, VA
 94th Training Division (Force Sustainment), at Fort Lee, VA
 100th Training Division (Operational Support), at Fort Knox, KY
 102nd Training Division (Maneuver Support), at Fort Leonard Wood, MO
 84th Training Command (Combat Support Training), at Fort Knox, KY
 78th Training Division (Operations), at Joint Base McGuire–Dix–Lakehurst, NJ
 86th Training Division (Decisive Action), at Fort McCoy, WI
 87th Training Division, at Birmingham, AL
 91st Training Division (Operations), in Jolon, CA
 108th Training Command (Initial Entry Training), in Charlotte, NC, under operational control of Training and Doctrine Command
 95th Training Division (Initial Entry Training), at Fort Sill, OK
 98th Training Division (Initial Entry Training), at Fort Benning, GA
 104th Training Division (Leader Training), at Joint Base Lewis–McChord, WA

Individual Ready Reserve
 The Individual Ready Reserve (IRR) consists of individuals who are active reservists but not assigned to a particular Active Reserve Unit.  Members of the IRR are encouraged to take advantage of training opportunities and are eligible for promotion provided all requirements are met.

Retired Reserve
The Retired Reserve consists of soldiers who have retired from either the active or reserve components of the Army but have not reached the age of 60.

Other components
The Army of the United States (AUS) is the official name for the conscripted force of the Army that may be raised at the discretion of the United States Congress, often at time of war or mobilization for war. The Army of the United States was first established in 1940 and its last use of the AUS was in 1974. The predecessors of the AUS were the National Army during World War I and the Volunteer Army during the American Civil War and Spanish–American War.

See also
 Uniformed Services Employment and Reemployment Rights Act
Comparable organizations
Army National Guard (U.S. Army)
United States Marine Corps Reserve
United States Navy Reserve
United States Coast Guard Reserve
Air National Guard (U.S. Air Force)
Air Force Reserve Command (U.S. Air Force)

References

Sources
 
 Wilson, John B. Maneuver and Firepower: The Evolution of Divisions and Separate Brigades. Washington, D.C.: Center of Military History (1997).

External links

Army Reserve News
 U.S. Army Reserve
 Full listings of Reserve units
 Army Reserve
 US Army Reserve Shooting Team

 
United States Army Direct Reporting Units
1908 establishments in the United States